Kennerdell is a census-designated place located in Rockland Township, Venango County in the state of Pennsylvania.  The community is located in southern Venango County along the Allegheny River.  As of the 2010 census the population was 247 residents.

Long before the arrival of the railroad, Kennerdell was a busy trade stop along the Allegheny River because of its location at the confluence of many tributaries. By the War of 1812, Kennerdell was shipping tons of material downriver. Wool, coal, timber from the great Allegheny forests north of Kennerdell, and produce from the area's farms were shipped on barges down the Allegheny to Fort Pitt and to market in Pittsburgh.

Demographics

References

External links
 Venango County, Pennsylvania: Kennerdell

Census-designated places in Venango County, Pennsylvania
Census-designated places in Pennsylvania